Dyn, Inc. was an Internet performance management and web application security company, offering products to monitor, control, and optimize online infrastructure, and also domain registration services and email products. The company was acquired by Oracle Corporation in 2016, and has operated as a global business unit of Oracle after the acquisition completed in 2017. Some Dyn services are planned to be retired by Oracle on May 31, 2023.

History 
Dyn was created as a community-led student project by Tim Wilde, who then hired Jeremy Hitchcock, Tom Daly and Chris Reinhardt during their undergraduate studies at Worcester Polytechnic Institute. Eventually Wilde brought in Hitchcock and Daly as partners. Dyn enabled students to access lab computers and print documents remotely. The project then moved towards Domain Name System (DNS) services. The first iteration was a free dynamic DNS service known as DynDNS. The project required $25,000 to stay open, and raised over $40,000.

The donation based model continued until 2002, and stopped with a launch of "donator-only" DNS services. Later, a premium service called the DynECT Managed DNS Platform became available in 2008, with the hiring of Kyle York, Gray Chynoweth and Cory von Wallenstein, as the business began to scale.

Pre-Acquisition (2011–2015) 
2011: Dyn opened an office in London, and eventually moved its EMEA headquarters to Brighton. In the same year, Dyn opened new headquarters in Manchester, New Hampshire, United States. 

October 2012: Dyn completed a Series A round of venture capital funding totaling US$38 million from North Bridge Venture Partners. Prior to the investment from North Bridge, the company had been self funded.

August 2013: Dyn launched its annual geek summer camp event, a business conference for the Internet performance industry.

April 2014: Dyn announced the discontinuation of its free hostname services effective May 7.

September 2014: Dyn Internet Intelligence, a SaaS-based product was launched.

2016 attack

On October 21, 2016, Dyn's networks were attacked three times with a distributed denial-of-service attack, causing major sites including Twitter, Reddit, GitHub, Amazon.com, Netflix, Spotify, RuneScape, Quora, and Dyn's own website to become unreachable via the URL (although most sites may have been available via IP address manually or through a maintained hosts file).

Acquisition by Oracle
May 2016: Dyn obtained further equity funding of $50 million from Pamplona Capital Management; total funding was $100M. The company had scaled to approximately $100M in annual recurring revenue prior to its acquisition by Oracle. Dyn launched its platform for Internet performance management.

October 2016: Colin Doherty was appointed the company's CEO.
November 21, 2016: Dyn announced that it had agreed to be acquired by Oracle Corporation.

June 2018: Oracle released the Internet Intelligence Map, a free tool that provides data about worldwide Internet traffic and disruptions. The map uses the Internet Intelligence technology Oracle acquired from Dyn.

June 2019: Oracle announced Dyn's Managed and Standard DNS services would be shutting down in May 2020; this date was later extended to May 31, 2023. The email sent to Standard DNS customers informed them that the Standard DNS service would be replaced by the "enhanced, paid subscription version" hosted  on Oracle Cloud Infrastructure (OCI). Several customers publicly shared that they would not be migrating to OCI. In addition, a large number of Dyn's Manchester, New Hampshire employees were laid off and the office space was put up for rent by the building owner. Many people were upset about this, including early Dyn adopters who were receiving "free for life" Standard DNS service, which was no longer being honored as of the transition to OCI DNS. "We truly appreciate your support throughout the years. While we are discontinuing the availability of services received at no-cost, you may be surprised by how affordable the DNS service is within OCI along with outstanding capabilities with this service."

Dyn acquisitions 
 Dyn acquired three companies during 2010: EveryDNS, EditDNS, and SendLabs.
 Dyn acquired these companies in the following years: 
 September 2012  the SEO/SEM & Ecommerce Development parts of Incutio LTD. They also acquired long time DNS provider TZO.com.
 January 2, 2013  web performance monitoring company Verelo.
 May 13, 2013  mobile dashboard app startup Trendslide.
 December 23, 2013  ReadyStatus, a tool that notifies customers of planned and unplanned service interruptions.
 March 26, 2014  Nettica, a US-based managed DNS provider.
 May 20, 2014  Renesys, specialist in monitoring the Internet to provide data about cloud services, connectivity and potential performance issues.
February 15, 2018  Oracle announced an agreement to acquire Zenedge, a Florida-based web application security company. The acquisition closed on March 5, 2018, and Zenedge became part of the Oracle Dyn Global Business Unit.

See also 

 DNS hosting service
 Public recursive name servers
 Dynamic DNS
 List of managed DNS providers

References

External links 
 Oracle Cloud DNS
 Dyn Community Forum
 Dyn's Help Center
 Dyn Status Updates
 

Alternative Internet DNS services
Dynamic DNS
Technology companies established in 1998
Internet technology companies of the United States
Companies based in Manchester, New Hampshire
Content-control software
Oracle acquisitions
2016 mergers and acquisitions